Trickster, full title known as , is a 2016 Japanese anime television series produced by TMS Entertainment and Shin-Ei Animation. It is directed by Masahiro Mukai and written by Erika Yoshida, with original character designs by Peach-Pit, adapted character designs by Shinya Yamada and music by Yuki Hayashi. It began airing on October 4, 2016 on Tokyo MX and Yomiuri TV. A manga adaptation of the anime by Mantohihi Binta began its serialization on June 20, 2016. A prequel original video animation split into two parts, titled "Episode 00", was released on December 22, 2016.

Plot
The story is set in 203X, and the  have been assembled under the mysterious detective Kogoro Akechi. Together, this group takes on cases both great and small. One of their junior members, Kensuke Hanasaki, is out solving a case one day when he happens upon Yoshio Kobayashi. Kobayashi, who has an undying body because of an "unidentifiable fog," wishes his own death and refuses contact with others. After seeing his abilities in action, Kensuke offers Yoshio a deal: join the Boy Detectives' Club and help them solve cases, and in exchange he will find a way to help Yoshio die.

The apathetic Yoshio accepts this deal begrudgingly, unaware of how different his life will become. Although he does not have much use for people, he gradually begins to acknowledge the group as he spends more time with them while solving cases.

The encounter between the two eventually leads them to the connection between the criminal nicknamed "Fiend with Twenty Faces" (Kaijin Nijuu Menso) and Kogoro Akechi.

Characters

One of the main characters. A mysterious boy with supernatural abilities, including immortality who seeks to die but is unable to do so. He's reluctantly recruited by Hanasaki as part of the Boy Detectives Club after Hanasaki takes an interest on him and after realizing that somehow, getting involved in their cases injures him where everything else fails. Although emotionally detached, blunt and indifferent of others at first, he begins to slowly grow a soft spot for the rest of the club, specially Hanasaki whom he wants to keep his promise to kill him one day.

It is theorized that the strength of his powers is inversely proportional to his desire to live, that is to say, his powers are at his strongest the least he values his own life, but weaken considerably the more he clings to life. His origins are revealed through a series of flashbacks. On them it is shown that Kobayashi, was born from a mother suffering from an Aggressive Autoimmune Disorder which had her heavily medicated. His father who knew that a pregnancy would tremendously debilitate her was against having a child. Nonetheless Kobayashi was born and his mother eventually succumbed to her illness. This causes Kobayashi's father to blame him for his wife's death and seeing no more reason in living, attempt to commit parricide, but Kobayashi's powers awoke and saved himself.

One of the main characters. A hyperactive boy, he constantly seeks cases and adventures for thrill and has an easygoing and friendly demeanor. After he notices Kobayashi and his abilities he becomes interested on him and recruits him to the Boy Detectives Club, promising to kill him as they both discover that somehow getting involved in cases injures Kobayashi, although he secretly plots to make him wish to live. Contrary to his extroverted personality, he's revealed to feel alone and unloved as his rich adoptive father barely contacts him, and Haruhiko, his adoptive older brother, is missing.

Following an incident involving Haruhiko that was secretly plotted by Twenty Faces, he becomes emotionally scarred after Haruhiko voices his hatred for him and that Akechi had lied to him about his brother and distances himself from the group before being manipulated by Twenty Faces to follow him and get revenge on both his father and Akechi. Upon realizing he was in fact loved by both but never truly realizing it, he comes to deeply regret his actions and apologizes to Kobayashi, whom wants Hanasaki to keep his promise. He attends Rurino Academy but only actually goes once each month since he's actually excused from having classes there.

One month after his kidnapping, Hanasaki is currently experiencing stress and suffers from periodical vasovagal response leading him to experience subtle faints. He's also no longer an active member of the Boy Detectives Club as the previous incident has made the relationships of the club difficult.

Akechi's right-hand man and the most senior member of the Boy Detectives Club. He was left paraplegic following a case he and a comrade worked on that caused beams of steel to fall on him. He's a strict and no-nonsense individual, but has a soft spot for the member of the club. He constantly clashes with Kobayashi over his lack of empathy but the two soften over time, albeit slightly. It's also shown that he really cares for Hanasaki, despite his regular behavior. During times when he is in peril he always takes it upon himself to protect him.

One month after Hanasaki's kidnapping, he currently heads Akechi's agency after Akechi leaves for unknown reasons, being told of his desires to disband the Club, which Inoue keeps from the rest of the club. During this time he treats Kobayashi considerably better than before.

A member of the Boy Detectives Club and the sole female member of the group. She's a thorough shut-in girl who never leaves her department, and only checks events outside through her owl, with her speciality being communications and hacking. She claims to be the "most healthy" member of the group as she's constantly seen exercising with machines in her room while doing Detective Work. She checks on and remains friendly with Hanasaki despite Inoue's stance after Hanasaki's kidnapping.

She is revealed to be a college graduate who successfully skips several grades and a shut-in only because she finds comfort in home as she has no "dark history" as she puts it, and she pays her taxes accordingly, so she sees no problem in her current life-style (both her shut-in life and her detective work) and merely likes it that way.

A corrupt police officer, and an acquaintance of Akechi. She has a business relationship with Akechi, allowing him free action in exchange of giving the police any credit for whatever case he solves. It is revealed that she is The Fiend With Twenty Faces's girlfriend and has been brainwashed by him.

A famous detective and the leader and founder of the Boy Detectives Club. Akechi is a master detective with keen insight and deduction ability, but is mostly seen as laid back and lazy. Although born with a different name, he was adopted by a Detective named Akechi Kogorō who rescued him from his abusive biological father and raised him. Following his death at the hands of a criminal, Akechi names himself after his adoptive father and cuts all ties with his biological one. He eventually turned into a mercenary where he became partners and friends with the eventual Twenty Faces, becoming enemies for life after the latter has all of Akechi's comrades killed in order to monopolize him.

In the past a younger Hanasaki had "hired" Akechi to find his brother Haruhiko, which he succeeds on doing, but upon discovering he is on a miserable state and living with suspicious individuals, Akechi bans Haruhiko from ever approaching Hanasaki, while Akechi himself serves as another parental figure for the boy motivating him to be stronger on his own. After the incident with Haruhiko upon which Hanasaki discovers his brother's hatred for him and that Akechi himself lied to him the boy distances himself from the Detective Club and soon becomes swayed by Twenty Faces who acted as if Hanasaki was kidnapped. Akechi fully aware this is a trap decides to rescue Hanasaki on his own and confronts his longtime nemesis; however, he succeeds in escaping after Kobayashi spreads sleeping gas while Twenty Faces was protected through his mask.

One month following this event it is known that Akechi separated himself from his agency, leaving Inoue in charge for the time being. He appears again before the club, announcing its disbanding and leaves, demanding to not be followed.

 

The main antagonist of the series and a criminal mastermind, he's recurrently seen with a mask. A manipulative and intelligent man, he's behind several incidents that the Boy Detectives Club face. He is a former mercenary and companion of Akechi until Twenty Faces developed a twisted sense of love for him and had all of Akechi's companions killed in order to seek his attention, creating his current persona to in his words, give Akechi "thrills" to make him feel alive. He has a gunshot scar on his chest courtesy of Akechi, and orchestrates many crimes in order to provoke and torture Akechi on an emotional level.

He manipulates Hanasaki to his side after involving his older adoptive brother in a case, which ended with Hanasaki emotionally scarred at his brother's hatred and causing his distancing from the club, convincing him to seek revenge with Akechi together. Although he is able to torment Akechi his plans were stopped by all of the Boy Detectives' Club, but he manages to escape before Akechi is able to kill and disappears, taking an interest in Kobayashi. Although considered captured by the authorities during this event, it is shown that he used a dummy to fake his capture while he's currently hiding and planning his next scheme. He is revealed to have the power to put people under hypnosis by kissing them on the lips.

According to Gackt, the character maintains a feeling of emptiness and indifference toward what is good and evil, as well has a lack of human emotions. He noted that the public should reexamine the presumption that the work's title refers to the Fiend With Twenty Faces.

A former member of the Boy Detectives Club. He was partnered with Inoue during the incident that left him paraplegic, and subsequently departs the club feeling himself unworthy of being a detective. He's a member of various clubs at his school and occasionally provides help to the Detectives' Club. He tries to convince Inoue to allow Hanasaki back into the Club despite Inoue's protests.

A member of the Boy Detectives Club and their engineer as well as the founder of Rurino Academy's Scientific Experiment Club, he comes up with the multiple devices and gadgets that Hanasaki uses and is good friends with him. However while he shows a friendly demeanor to Hanasaki, deep down he doesn't forgive him for his actions during his kidnapping.

A member of Rurino Academy's Scientific Experiment Club and a rather short boy. He's constantly teased by both Hanasaki and Otomo. He greatly admires Otomo and Inoue and aspires to be part of the Boy Detectives Club. He becomes an official member after solving his own case.

He is the leader of a gang of self proclaimed "hooligans". During his younger years he spent some time in juvenile detention.

Production
The anime production, inspired from The Boy Detectives Club (1937) and The Fiend With Twenty Faces (1936) novels written by Edogawa Ranpo, was unveiled by TMS Entertainment on June 1, 2016, with the anime's official website listing the series' main staff, main cast, synopsis and broadcast dates. Along with the anime, the project will include a manga, stage play, and a live-action film adaptation.

Broadcast
The series began airing on Tokyo MX at 1:05am and Yomiuri TV at 1:59am on October 4, 2016. It will later air on BS11 at 1:30am on October 5, 2016. The anime's first opening theme song from episodes 1 to 12 is "Kimi Dake no Boku de Iru Kara" by Gackt, while the first ending theme song, titled "1Hope Sniper", is performed by Azusa Tadokoro. It will be released across 8 Blu-ray home video release volumes, totalling 24 episodes. Crunchyroll is simulcasting the anime. Funimation is currently streaming a simuldub on their website, starting with the first episode on November 3, 2016.

A prequel OVA written by Gō Zappa and Takeshi Miyamoto, titled "Episode 00", was released on December 22, 2016. The OVA consists of two parts with each part running for 25 minutes, totalling 50 minutes.

Episode list

Adaptations

Manga
Binta's manga adaptation began serialization in Kodansha's July 2016 issue of Magazine Special on June 20, 2016. The manga series has been compiled in one tankōbon volume as of October 2016; the first volume was released on October 17, 2016.

Volume list

|}

References
Notes

References

External links
 

2016 anime television series debuts
2016 manga
Detective anime and manga
Funimation
Kodansha manga
Shin-Ei Animation
Shōnen manga
TMS Entertainment